Smithshire is an unincorporated community in Warren County, Illinois, United States. Smithshire has a post office with ZIP code 61478.

History

Smithshire came into being with the building of the Atchison, Topeka and Santa Fe Railway in 1888.  It is the only population center in Ellison Township. The abandoned town of Ellison was two miles (3 km) from Smithshire. Ellison began in the 1830s, but suffered from a catastrophic tornado in 1858, dampening its growth. The remaining community moved to Smithshire with the coming of the railroad.
 
Smithshire is the location of the corporate offices of Twomey Company Twomey Company. Twomey Company was a family owned agribusiness corporation, beginning in 1945. Consolidated Grain and Barge purchased the Twomey Company in 2012. Twomey Co had storage capacity for 51 million bushels when it was sold. Twomey Company operated in several western Illinois locations, including a barge loading facility on the Mississippi River.

Smithshire has a population of approximately 100. Smithshire has one church, the Smithshire United Methodist Church United Methodist Church. Smithshire is a part of the West Central High School, district 235.

References

Unincorporated communities in Warren County, Illinois
Unincorporated communities in Illinois
Populated places established in 1888